Domingo is the debut studio album by Gal Costa and Caetano Veloso. It was released on Philips Records in 1967.

Critical reception

Richard Mortifoglio of AllMusic described the album as "a quiet, post-bossa nova effort characterized by fine singing and some very good songs, some of them penned by Veloso himself." Rob Arcand of Vice wrote, "Caetano Veloso would become an especially strong proponent of the acoustic style of João Gilberto; his 1967 debut album Domingo offered a near-perfect recreation of the soft voice and playing style of the Bahia native, even as his lyrics had more to do with staying strong amid political uncertainty than lazing about on the Ipanema shores."

Track listing

Personnel
Credits adapted from liner notes.

 Gal Costa – vocals
 Caetano Veloso – vocals
 Dori Caymmi – arrangement (1, 2), production, acoustic guitar
 Francis Hime – arrangement (3, 4)
 Roberto Menescal – arrangement (5)

References

External links
 

1967 debut albums
Gal Costa albums
Caetano Veloso albums
Bossa nova albums
Philips Records albums